This is a list of Intel Pentium D processors, based on the NetBurst architecture and targeted at the consumer market. Two generations were released, using the Smithfield and Presler cores and branded as 8xx- and 9xx-series respectively, as well as Pentium Extreme Edition 840, 955, and 965.

Dual-core desktop processors

Pentium D

"Smithfield" (90 nm) 
 All models support: MMX, SSE, SSE2, SSE3, Intel 64, XD bit (an NX bit implementation)
 Enhanced Intel SpeedStep Technology (EIST) supported by: 830, 840
 Steppings: A0, B0
 Package size: 37.5 mm × 37.5 mm
 Die size: 206 mm²

"Presler" (65 nm)  
 All models support: MMX, SSE, SSE2, SSE3, Intel 64, XD bit (an NX bit implementation)
 Enhanced Intel SpeedStep Technology (EIST) supported by: C1 & D0 steppings
 Intel VT-x supported by: models 9x0
 Intel VT-x NOT supported by: models 9x5
 Steppings: B1, C1, D0
 Package size: 37.5 mm × 37.5 mm
 Die size: 2 × 81 mm²

Pentium Extreme Edition

"Smithfield" (90 nm) 
 All models support: MMX, SSE, SSE2, SSE3, Hyper-Threading, Enhanced Intel SpeedStep Technology (EIST), Intel 64, XD bit (an NX bit implementation)
 Stepping: A0
 Package size: 37.5 mm × 37.5 mm 
 Die size: 206 mm²

"Presler" (65 nm) 
 All models support: MMX, SSE, SSE2, SSE3, Hyper-Threading, Enhanced Intel SpeedStep Technology (EIST), Intel 64, XD bit (an NX bit implementation), Intel VT-x
 Steppings: B1, C1
 Package size: 37.5 mm × 37.5 mm 
 Die size: 2 × 81 mm²

See also 
 List of Intel Pentium processors
 Pentium 4
 Pentium D
 Pentium Extreme Edition

References

External links 
 Intel 2006 dual-core roadmap
 Intel Pentium D processor (comparison tool from Intel site)

Pentium D
Intel Pentium D